Euomphaloceratinae is a subfamily of Upper Cretaceous ammonites included in the Acanthoceratidae, characterized by generally evolute shells with quadrate whorl sections that are strongly ribbed. Sutures are ammonitic, but not overly complex.

Genera include:
Burroceras
Codazziceras
Euomphaloceras, (type genus)
Hourcqiceras
Kamerunoceras
Lotzeites
Morrowites
Paraburroceras
Paramammites
Pseudaspidoceras
Romaniceras
Shuparoceras

some of which have been removed from other taxa where originally placed.

Euomphaloceras, the type genus of the subfamily, was removed from the Acanthoceratinae sensu Arkell et al. 1957, Kamarunoceras and Pseuaspidoceras from the Mammitinae,  sensu Arkell et al. 1957.  Others were added since initial publication of the Treatise on Invertebrate Paleontology in 1957.

References 

 W.C. Arkell et al., 1957. Mesozoic Ammonoidea, Treatise on Invertebrate Paleontology, Part L, Mollusca 4. Geological Society of America and University of Kansas Press.
 Cyril Baudouin Taxonomique Ammonites, Ammonites et autres fossiles 
 Euomphaloceratinae,  in ammonites.fr

Acanthoceratidae
Cenomanian first appearances
Coniacian extinctions
Prehistoric animal subfamilies